, also spelt as Minami Daitō or Minami-Daitō, is the largest island in the Daitō Islands group southeast of Okinawa, Japan. It is administered as part of the village of Minamidaitō, Okinawa. Shimajiri District, Okinawa and has a population of 2,107. The island is entirely cultivated for agriculture, although it lacks freshwater sources. The island has no beaches but has a fishing boat harbor and three cargo and ferry ports; as well as an airport Minami Daito Airport (airport code "MMD").

Geography
As with the other islands in the archipelago, Minamidaitōjima is an uplifted coral atoll with a steep coastal cliff of limestone (the former fringing coral reef of the island), and a depressed center (the former lagoon of the island).

Climate
Minamidaitōjima has a tropical rainforest climate (Köppen climate classification Af) with hot summers and warm winters. Precipitation is significant throughout the year; the wettest month is June and the driest month is February. The island is subject to frequent typhoons.

History
It is uncertain when Minamidaitōjima was discovered. It was then charted, together with Kitadaitōjima, as "The Two Sisters". There is little doubt that Minamidaitōjima and Kitadaitōjima were again sighted by the Spanish on 28 July 1587, by Pedro de Unamuno who named them the "Useless Islands". In 1788 the British captain John Meares named an island in the vicinity “Grampus Island”, but the recorded coordinates are not correct and it is not certain which of the Daitō island he sighted . The French also reported sighting an island in 1807. However, on 2 July 1820 the Russian vessel Borodino surveyed the two Daitō islands, and named the south as "South Borodino Island".

The island remained uninhabited until claimed by the Empire of Japan in 1885. The population reached 4000 in 1919. During this period until World War II, Minamidaitōjima was owned in its entirety by Dai Nippon Sugar (now Dai Nippon Meiji Sugar), which provided community services and subsidized pricing for its employees, and of whom were seasonal workers from Okinawa and Taiwan.

The island was garrisoned by the Japanese military in 1942. As the war situation worsened for Japan, many of the civilian inhabitants were evacuated to Okinawa, Kyushu or Hachijojima in 1944. The island was repeatedly bombed and shelled by the United States Navy from February to June 1945.

After World War II, the island was occupied by the United States, at which time its civilian population was 1426. The island was returned to Japan in 1972.

References

Citations

Bibliography
Kakzu, Hiroshi. Island Sustainability: Challenges and Opportunities for Okinawa. Trafford Publishing (2012) 
 .

External links

 official home page

Daitō Islands
Islands of Okinawa Prefecture